The Church of the Covenant is a historic church at 67 Newbury Street in the Back Bay neighborhood of Boston, Massachusetts.  A National Historic Landmark, it was built in 1865-1867 by the Central Congregational Church,  and is now affiliated with the Presbyterian Church (USA) and the United Church of Christ.  The church was designed by Richard M. Upjohn, and its distinctive interior is largely the work of Tiffany & Co.

History
Built of Roxbury puddingstone in Gothic Revival style it was one of the first churches to relocate in the new Back Bay and was built largely with funds donated by Benjamin Bates, an industrialist who founded Bates College. Designed by Richard M. Upjohn, the son and partner of Richard Upjohn, who insisted on "a high gothic edifice ... which no ordinary dwelling house would overtop." Oliver Wendell Holmes said: "We have one steeple in Boston that to my eyes seems absolutely perfect — that of the Central Church on the corner of Newbury and Berkeley Streets." In the 1890s the sanctuary was redecorated by Tiffany Glass and Decorating Co. with stained-glass windows and mosaics and an electric-light chandelier designed by Tiffany's Jacob Adolphus Holzer for the World's Columbian Exhibition, Chicago, 1893.

The Church of the Covenant is located at 67 Newbury Street.  It was known as the "Central Church" until 1932 when the Central Congregational Church merged with the First Presbyterian Church of Boston creating the Church of the Covenant, which is now affiliated with both the Presbyterian Church (USA) and the United Church of Christ.

In 1966, the Back Bay historic district was established, protecting any building within its boundaries from exterior changes, including this church building. In October 2012 the church building was designated a National Historic Landmark (as "Central Congregational Church") in recognition of its unique interior decorations.

In 1999 The Church of the Covenant was the setting of the opening scene of the movie Boondock Saints. Two deeply Catholic brothers, Connor and Murphy MacManus (played by Sean Patrick Flanery and Norman Reedus respectively) show their devotion in church as the priest rails against the passive indifference to evil. Given the nature of the script, there were problems finding a church liberal enough to permit filming inside. The company finally got permission from the Church of the Covenant. This isn’t actually a Catholic church though and that imposing crucifix was built just for the film.

Gallery of interior views

See also
Arlington Street Church - nearby Boston church with 16 Tiffany stained-glass windows
List of National Historic Landmarks in Massachusetts
National Register of Historic Places listings in northern Boston, Massachusetts

Notes

External links

 Church of the Covenant website

Gothic Revival church buildings in Massachusetts
Churches in Boston
Churches completed in 1867
Congregational churches in Boston
19th-century Presbyterian church buildings in the United States
Presbyterian churches in Massachusetts
United Church of Christ churches in Massachusetts
Towers in Massachusetts
Richard Michell Upjohn church buildings
National Historic Landmarks in Boston
Churches on the National Register of Historic Places in Massachusetts
Back Bay, Boston
Historic district contributing properties in Massachusetts
National Register of Historic Places in Boston